The Russian Second League 1993 was the second edition of Russian Second Division. There were 7 zones with 124 teams in total. In 1994 the Russian League system was reorganized, with First League reduced to one tournament instead of 3 zones and new professional Third League organized, where most of the teams from the 1993 Second League ended up. No teams were promoted to the 1994 Russian First League.

Zone 1

Stage 1 

Notes:

 FC Baysachnr Elista played on the amateur level as FC Gilyan Elista in 1992.
 FC Etalon Baksan renamed to FC Avtozapchast Baksan.

1st to 7th places tournament

8th to 14th places tournament 

Notes:
 FC Sherstyanik Nevinnomyssk did not participate in any national-level competitions in 1994.
 FC Baysachnr Elista was converted to the reserve team of FC Uralan Elista called FC Uralan-d Elista in 1994.

Top scorers 
30 goals
  Ibragim Gasanbekov (FC Anzhi Makhachkala)

24 goals
 Gadzhiali Alidibirov (FC Dynamo Makhachkala)

19 goals
 Aleksandr Krotov (FC Astrateks Astrakhan)
 Nikolai Shichkin (FC Astrateks Astrakhan)

18 goals
 Abilfez Madanov (FC Sherstyanik Nevinnomyssk)

17 goals
 Gennadi Goncharov (FC Baysachnr Elista)

15 goals
 Vladimir Benedsky (FC Druzhba Budyonnovsk)

14 goals
 Alik Dulayev (FC Iriston Vladikavkaz)
 Igor Khmelevskiy (FC Kavkazkabel Prokhladny)

13 goals
 Aleksandr Bocharnikov (FC Volgar Astrakhan)
 Boris Bodzhikov (FC Baysachnr Elista)
 Yaroslav Kazberov (FC Druzhba Budyonnovsk)
 Roman Sidorov (FC Beshtau Lermontov)
 Aleksandr Solomakhin (FC Druzhba Budyonnovsk)
 Oleg Zhurtov (FC Avtozapchast Baksan)

Zone 2

Standings 

Notes:
 FC Torpedo Adler was excluded from the league after playing 8 games and gaining 4 points. Their head coach was Vadim Nikiforov. All their results were discarded.
 FC ISM Volzhsky was excluded from the league before playing any games. They were promoted from the Amateur Football League where they played as FC Metallurg ISM Volzhsky in 1992.
 FC Istochnik Rostov-on-Don and FC Kolos-2 Krasnodar played their first professional season.
 FC Energomash Belgorod renamed to FC Salyut Belgorod.
 FC Rostselmash-d Rostov-on-Don did not play in any national-level competitions in 1994.

Top scorers 
16 goals
 Konstantin Boyko (FC SKA Rostov-on-Don)
 Vladimir Korsunov (FC Shakhtyor Shakhty)

15 goals
 Roman Nerubenko (FC Salyut Belgorod)

14 goals
 Sergei Borodin (FC Zvezda-Rus Gorodishche)
 Andrei Fomichyov (FC Salyut Belgorod)
 Aleksandr Medvedev (FC Salyut Belgorod)
 Mikhail Sukhorukov (FC Avangard Kursk)

13 goals
 Aleksei Chernov  (FC Zvezda-Rus Gorodishche)

12 goals
 Yuri Konovalov (FC Rotor-d Volgograd)

11 goals
 Yevgeni Borzykin (FC Avangard Kursk)
 Vladimir Grishchenko (FC Niva Slavyansk-na-Kubani)
 Aleksandr Kamentsev (FC Venets Gulkevichi)
 Vagif Shirinov (FC Kuban Barannikovskiy)
 Andrei Stepanov (FC Torpedo Armavir)

Zone 3

Standings 

Notes:
 FC Kristall Smolensk were promoted from the Amateur Football League where they played as FC SKD Smolensk in 1992.
 FC Zavolzhye Engels and FC Khimik Uvarovo were promoted from the Amateur Football League.
 FC Metallurg Stary Oskol played their first professional season.
 FC Don Novomoskovsk did not play professionally in 1992.
 FC MGU Saransk renamed to FC Saranskeksport Saransk.
 FC Spartak Oryol renamed to FC Oryol.
 FC Saranskeksport Saransk, FC Zavolzhye Engels and FC Metallurg Stary Oskol did not participate in any national-level competitions in 1994.

Top scorers 
22 goals
 Vladimir Kharin (FC Irgiz Balakovo)

16 goals
 Andrei Grishchuk (FC Don Novomoskovsk)
 Anatoli Sigachyov (FC Spartak Tambov)

15 goals
 Yuri Telyushov (FC Zenit Penza)

14 goals
 German Telesh (FC Arsenal Tula)

13 goals
 Pyotr Ageyev (FC Saranskeksport Saransk)
 Vladimir Anisimov (FC Khimik Dzerzhinsk)
 Aleksei Gudkov (FC Kristall Smolensk)
 Aleksei Ivanov (FC Zavolzhye Engels)
 Vyacheslav Ulitin (FC Zenit Penza)

Zone 4

Standings 

Note:
 FC Obninsk and FC Spartak Shchyolkovo promoted from the Amateur Football League.
 FC Kosmos-Kvest Dolgoprudny promoted from the Amateur Football League, where they played in 1992 as FC Kosmos Dolgoprudny.
 FC Viktor-Gigant Voskresensk, FC Rekord Aleksandrov and FC SUO Moscow played their first professional season.
 FC Torpedo Mytishchi renamed to FC Torpedo-MKB Mytishchi.
 FC Avangard Kolomna renamed to FC Viktor-Avangard Kolomna.
 FC Presnya Moscow renamed to FC Asmaral-d Moscow.

Top scorers 
32 goals
 Salekh Abdulkayumov (FC Obninsk)

29 goals
 Andrey Tikhonov (FC Spartak-d Moscow)

22 goals
 Igor Nekrasov (FC Dynamo-2 Moscow)
 Igor Voronin (FC Torgmash Lyubertsy)

21 goals
 Leonid Markevich (PFC CSKA-d Moscow)

20 goals
 Aleksandr Kiryanov (PFC CSKA-2 Moscow)
 Igor Konyayev (FC Obninsk)

18 goals
 Aleksandr Antonov (FC Viktor-Avangard Kolomna)
 Aleksei Kutsenko (FC Dynamo-2 Moscow)

17 goals
 Vyacheslav Melnikov (PFC CSKA-d Moscow)
 Nikolai Simachyov (FC Spartak Shchyolkovo)

Zone 5

Standings 

Notes:
 FC Sputnik Kimry was excluded after playing 7 games and gaining 1 point. Their head coach was Aleksandr Shchetinin. All their results were discarded.
 FC Kraneks Ivanovo was promoted from the Amateur Football League.
 FC Zenit-2 St. Petersburg, FC Vest Kaliningrad and FC Spartak-Arktikbank Arkhangelsk played their first professional season.
 FC Karelia Petrozavodsk renamed to FC Erzi Petrozavodsk.
 FC Aleks Gatchina renamed to FC Gatchina.
 FC Zvolma-Spartak Kostroma renamed to FC Spartak Kostroma.
 FC Progress Chernyakhovsk, FC Spartak-Arktikbank Arkhangelsk and FC Kosmos-Kirovets St. Petersburg did not participate in any national-level competitions in 1994.

Top scorers 
15 goals
 Aleksandr Panov (FC Zenit-2 St. Petersburg)

14 goals
 Sergei Boldyrev (FC Lokomotiv St. Petersburg)

13 goals
 Andrei Borisov (FC Trion-Volga Tver)
 Viktor Karman (FC Progress Chernyakhovsk)
 Sergei Rybakov (FC Gatchina)
 Aleksandr Selenkov (FC Erzi Petrozavodsk)

11 goals
 Mikhail Trukhlov (FC Vympel Rybinsk)

10 goals
 Roman Chevychelov (FC Spartak Kostroma)
 Sergei Molkov (FC Kraneks Ivanovo)
 Vladimir Rozhin (FC Vympel Rybinsk)
 Igor Ukhanov (FC Erzi Petrozavodsk)

Zone 6

Standings 

Notes:
 FC Metiznik Magnitogorsk were promoted from the Amateur Football League, where they played in 1992 as FC Metiznik-Alternativa Magnitogorsk.
 FC Uralelektromed Verkhnyaya Pyshma were promoted from the Amateur Football League, where they played in 1992 as FC MTsOP-Metallurg Verkhnyaya Pyshma.
 FC SKD Samara, FC Progress Zelenodolsk, FC Dynamo Perm and FC Volga Balakovo did not play professionally in 1992.
 FC KAMAZ-d Naberezhnye Chelny played their first professional season.
 FC Avtopribor Oktyabrsky renamed to FC Devon Oktyabrsky.
 FC Dynamo Kirov renamed to FC Vyatka Kirov.
 FC KATs-Skif Naberezhnye Chelny renamed to FC KamAZavtotsentr Naberezhnye Chelny.
 FC Gastello Ufa renamed to FC KDS Samrau Ufa.
 FC Torpedo-UdGu Izhevsk renamed to FC Torpedo Izhevsk.
 FC Uralelektromed Verkhnyaya Pyshma was converted to the reserve team of FC Uralmash Yekaterinburg called FC Uralmash-d Yekaterinburg in 1994.
 FC Elektron Almetyevsk played in the Amateur Football League in 1994 as FC Devon Almetyevsk.
 FC Azamat Cheboksary and FC Torpedo Izhevsk did not participate in any national-level competition in 1994.

Top scorers 
31 goals
 Igor Syrov (FC Devon Oktyabrsky)

28 goals
 Vyacheslav Yevsin (FC Metallurg Novotroitsk)

25 goals
 Igor Palachyov (FC Zarya Krotovka)

24 goals
 Dmitri Yemelyanov (FC Zarya Krotovka)

23 goals
 Aleksandr Varnosov (FC Azamat Cheboksary)
 Maksim Kovalyov (FC Uralelektromed Verkhnyaya Pyshma)

22 goals
 Vladimir Korolyov (FC SKD Samara)

20 goals
 Yuri Adonyev (FC KamAZavtotsentr Naberezhnye Chelny)
 Oleg Kleshnin (FC Gornyak Kachkanar)
 Nikolai Kurilov (FC Vyatka Kirov)

Zone 7

Standings 

Notes:
 FC Shakhtyor Kiselyovsk were promoted from the Amateur Football League, where they played in 1992 as FC Nika Kiselyovsk.
 FC Lokomotiv Ussuriysk were promoted from the Amateur Football League.
 FC Dynamo Omsk and FC Okean-d Nakhodka played their first professional season.
 FC Aleks Angarsk renamed to FC Angara Angarsk.
 FC Dynamo Kemerovo, FC Gornyak Gramoteino, FC Shakhtyor Artyom, FC Okean-d Nakhodka and FC Lokomotiv Ussuriysk did not participate in any national-level competitions in 1994.

Top scorers 
20 goals
 Yevgeni Shipovskiy (FC Torpedo Rubtsovsk)

11 goals
 Sergei Sokolov (FC Shakhtyor Kiselyovsk)

10 goals
 Sergei Rogalevskiy (FC Gornyak Gramoteino)
 Andrei Semerenko (FC Amur Blagoveshchensk)

9 goals
 Andrei Dolgopolov (FC Angara Angarsk)
 Yuri Kuznetsov (FC Angara Angarsk)
 Yuri Sergiyenko (FC Shakhtyor Artyom)

8 goals
 Sergei Ageyev (FC Politekhnik-92 Barnaul)
 Sergei Bogochev (FC Dynamo Kemerovo)
 Leonid Kiyenko (FC Okean-d Nakhodka)

See also
1993 Russian Top League
1993 Russian First League

References
 Russian Second League 1993 on KLISF

3
1993
Russia
Russia